Sierra Leone is officially a secular state, although Islam and Christianity are the two main and dominant religions in the country. The constitution of Sierra Leone provides for freedom of religion and the Sierra Leone Government generally protects it. The Sierra Leone Government is constitutionally forbidden from establishing a state religion, though Muslim and Christian prayers are usually held in the country at the beginning of major political occasions, including presidential inauguration.

According to a 2020 estimates by the Pew Research Center 78.5% of Sierra Leone's population are Muslims (mostly Sunni Muslims), 20.4% are Christians (mostly Protestants) and 1.1% belong to a traditional African religion or other beliefs. The Inter-Religious Council of Sierra Leone estimated that 77% of Sierra Leone's population are Muslims, 21% are Christians, and 2% are followers of traditional African religion. Most of Sierra Leone's ethnic groups are Muslim majority, including the country's two largest ethnic groups: the Mende and Temne.

Sierra Leone is regarded as one of the most religiously tolerant countries in the world. Muslims and Christians collaborate and interact with each other peacefully. Religious violence is very rare in the country. Even during the Sierra Leonean Civil War people were never targeted because of their religion.

The country is home to the Sierra Leone Inter-Religious Council, which is made up of both Christian and Muslim religious leaders to promote peace and tolerance throughout the country. The Islamic holidays of Eid al-Fitr, Eid al-Adha and Maulid-un-Nabi (Birthday of the Islamic prophet Muhammad) are observed as national holidays in Sierra Leone. The Christian holidays of Christmas, Boxing Day, Good Friday and Easter are also national holidays in Sierra Leone. In politics the overwhelming majority of Sierra Leoneans vote for a candidate without regard of the candidate being a Muslim or a Christian. All of Sierra Leone"s Heads of State have been Christians except Ahmad Tejan Kabbah, who was a Muslim.

The vast majority of Sierra Leonean Muslims are adherent to the Sunni tradition of Islam. Most of the Mosque and Islamic schools across Sierra Leone are based on Sunni Islam. Shia Muslims form a very small percentage, at less than half of one percent of Sierra Leone's Muslim population. Most of Sierra Leonean Muslims of the Sunni and Ahmadiyya sect regularly pray together in the same Mosque. The Maliki school is by far the most dominant Islamic school of jurisprudence across Sierra Leone and is based within Sunni Islam, though many Ahmadiyya Muslims in Sierra Leone also follow the Maliki Jurisprudence.

The Sierra Leone Islamic Supreme Council, is the highest Islamic religious organization in Sierra Leone and is made up of the country's Imams, Islamic scholars, and other Islamic clerics across the country. Sheikh Muhammad Taha Jalloh is the president of the Sierra Leone Supreme Islamic Council  The United Council of Imams, is an Islamic religious body in Sierra Leone, that is made up of all imams of mosques throughout Sierra Leone. The president of the United Council of Imam is Sheikh Alhaji Muhammad Habib Sheriff. The two largest mosques in Sierra Leone are the Freetown Central Mosque and the Ghadafi Central Mosque (built by former Libyan leader Muammar Gaddafi), both located in the capital Freetown.

Among the present most highly  prominent Sierra Leonean Muslim scholars and preachers are Sheikh Abu Bakarr Cotco Kamara, Sheikh Muhammad Taha Jalloh, Sheikh Umarr S. Kanu, Sheikh Ahmad Tejan Sillah, Sheikh Saeedu Rahman, and Sheikh Muhammad Habib Sheriff. All of the Sierra Leonean Muslim Scholars mention above are Sunni Muslims, except Sheikh Ahmad Tejan Sillah, who is a Shia Muslim; and Sheikh Saeedu Rahman, who is an Ahmaddiya Muslim.

The large majority of Sierra Leonean Christians are Protestant, of which the largest groups are the Wesleyan Methodists and Pentecostal. Other Christian Protestant denominations with significant presence in the country include Presbyterians, Baptists, Seventh-day Adventists Anglicans, Lutherans, and Pentecostals. The Council of Churches is the Protestant Christian religious organisation that is made up of all Protestant churches across Sierra Leone. Recently there has been an increase of Pentecostal churches, especially in Freetown.

Non-denominational Christians form a significant minority of Sierra Leone's Christian population. Catholics are the largest group of non-Protestant Christians in Sierra Leone, forming about 8% of Sierra Leone's population and 26% of the Christian population in Sierra Leone. The Jehovah’s Witnesses and members of the Church of Jesus Christ of Latter-day Saints are the two most prominent non Trinitarian Christians in Sierra Leone, and they form a small but significant minority of the Christian population in Sierra Leone. A small community of Orthodox Christians resides in the capital Freetown.

In September 2017, a Sierra Leone-based radical Nigerian Pentecostal Christian pastor name Victor Ajisafe was arrested by the Sierra Leone Police and held in jail after he preached an extreme religious intolerance and a fanatical hate speech against Islam and Sierra Leonean Muslims at his church sermon in the capital Freetown. Among other words in his speech; Ajisafe said Islam is an evil religion, and he further said there is no trace of Islam in the history of Sierra Leone; even though factually Muslim missionaries have taught Islam in Sierra Leone over 430 years ago and the country has remained a Muslim majority for centuries. Many Christian organizations in Sierra Leone, including the Council of Churches condemned Ajisafe's sermon against Islam and Muslims. Ajisafe"s church was temporarily shut down by the Sierra Leone government and his church license was temporarily suspended too. The incident brought religious tension in Sierra Leone, in a country known for its very high level of religious tolerance, as many Sierra Leonean Muslims at home and abroad were extremely angry. Many Sierra Leonean Muslims called for Ajisafe to be deported back to his home country of Nigeria, and few even threatened to attack the church. The pastor while in Sierra Leone police custody apologized to Sierra Leonean Muslims and to the government of Sierra Leone. After several days in jail, Ajisafe was released, his church license was given back to him, and his church was later reopened under strict government condition during several months of probation.

Ethnic groups 

Sierra Leone is home to about sixteen ethnic groups, each with its own language. The largest and most influential are the Temne at about 36%, and the Mende at about 33%. The Temne predominate in the Northern Sierra Leone and the areas around the capital of Sierra Leone. The Mende predominate in South-Eastern Sierra Leone (with the exception of Kono District).

The vast majority of Temne are Muslims at over 85%; and with a small Christian minority at about 10%. The Mende are also Muslim majority at about 70%, though with a large Christian minority at about 28%. Sierra Leone's national politics centres on the competition between the north-west, dominated by the Temne, and the south-east dominated by the Mende. The vast majority of the Mende support the Sierra Leone People's Party (SLPP); while the majority of the Temne support the All People's Congress (APC).

The Mende, who are believed to be descendants of the Mane, originally occupied the Liberian hinterland. They began moving into Sierra Leone slowly and peacefully in the eighteenth century. The Temne are thought to have come from Futa Jallon, which is in present-day Guinea.

The third-largest ethnic group are the Limba at about 6.4% of the population. The Limba are native people of Sierra Leone. They have no tradition of origin, and it is believed that they have lived in Sierra Leone since before the European encounter. The Limba are primarily found in Northern Sierra Leone, particularly in Bombali, Kambia and Koinadugu District. The Limba are about equally divided between Muslims and Christians. The Limba are close political allies of the neighbouring Temne.

Since Independence, the Limba have traditionally been very influential in Sierra Leone's politics, along with the Mende. The vast majority of Limba support the All People's Congress (APC) political party. Sierra Leone's first and second presidents, Siaka Stevens and Joseph Saidu Momoh, respectively, were both ethnic Limba. Sierra Leone's current defense minister Alfred Paolo Conteh is an ethnic Limba.
 
One of the biggest minority ethnic groups are the Fula at around 3.4% of the population. Descendants of seventeenth- and eighteenth-century Fula migrant settlers from the Fouta Djalon region of Guinea, they live primarily in the northeast and the western area of Sierra Leone. The Fula are virtually all Muslims at over 99%. The Fula are primarily traders, and many live in middle-class homes. Because of their trading, the Fulas are found in nearly all parts of the country.

The other ethnic groups are the Mandingo (also known as Mandinka). They are descendants of traders from Guinea who migrated to Sierra Leone during the late nineteenth to mid-twentieth centuries. The Mandika are predominantly found in the east and the northern part of the country. They predominate in the large towns, most notably Karina, in Bombali District in the north; Kabala and Falaba in Koinadugu District in the north; and Yengema, Kono District in the east of the country. Like the Fula, the Mandinka are virtually all Muslims at over 99%. Sierra Leone's third president Ahmad Tejan Kabbah, and Sierra Leone's first Vice-President Sorie Ibrahim Koroma were both ethnic Mandingo.

Next in proportion are the Kono, who live primarily in Kono District in Eastern Sierra Leone. The Kono are descendants of migrants from Guinea; today their workers are known primarily as diamond miners. The majority of the Kono ethnic group are Christians, though with an influential Muslim minority. Sierra Leone's former Vice-President Alhaji Samuel Sam-Sumana is an ethnic Kono.

The small but significant Sierra Leone Creole people or Krio people (descendants of freed African American, West Indian and Liberated African slaves who settled in Freetown between 1787 and about 1885) make up about 3% of the population. They primarily occupy the capital city of Freetown and its surrounding Western Area. Krio culture reflects the Western culture and ideals within which many of their ancestors originated – they also had close ties with British officials and colonial administration during years of development.

The Krios have traditionally dominated Sierra Leone's judiciacy and Freetown's elected city council. One of the first ethnic groups to become educated according to Western traditions, they have traditionally been appointed to positions in the civil service, beginning during the colonial years. They continue to be influential in the civil service. The vast majority of Krios are Christians at about 99%.

The Oku people, descended primarily from Yoruba Liberated Africans, are another non-native ethnic group with a Muslim majority of 99%.

Other minority ethnic groups are the Kuranko, who are related to the Mandingo, and are largely Muslims. The Kuranko are believed to have begun arriving in Sierra Leone from Guinea in about 1600 and settled in the north, particularly in Koinadugu District. The Kuranko are primarily farmers; leaders among them have traditionally held several senior positions in the Military. The current Governor of the Bank of Sierra Leone Kaifala Marah is an ethnic Kuranko. The Kuranko are largely Muslim majority.

The Loko in the north are native people of Sierra Leone, believed to have lived in Sierra Leone since the time of European encounter. Like the neighbouring Temne, the Loko are Muslim majority. The Susu and their related Yalunka are traders; both groups are primarily found in the far north in Kambia and Koinadugu District close to the border with Guinea. The Susu and Yalunka are both descendants of migrants from Guinea; and they both are virtually all Muslims at over 99%.

The Kissi live further inland in South-Eastern Sierra Leone. They predominate in the large town of Koindu and its surrounding areas in Kailahun District. The vast majority of Kissi are Christians. The much smaller Vai and Kru peoples are primarily found in Kailahun and Pujehun Districts near the border with Liberia. The Kru predominate in the Kroubay neighbourhood in the capital Freetown. The Vai are largely Muslim majority at about 90%, while the Kru are virtually all Christians at over 99%.

On the coast in Bonthe District in the south are the Sherbro. Native to Sierra Leone, they have occupied Sherbro Island since it was founded. The Sherbro are primarily fisherman and farmers, and they are predominantly found in Bonthe District. The Sherbro are virtually all Christians, and their paramount chiefs had a history of intermarriage with British colonists and traders.

Islam in Sierra Leone

Christianity 

The vast majority of Sierra Leonean Christians are Protestants with biggest groups being Methodists and various Evangelical Protestants. Other Protestant denominations in the country include Presbyterians, Baptists, Seventh-day Adventists and Lutherans.

Roman Catholics are the second largest non-Protestant Christians division in Sierra Leone at about 5% of the country's population.

The Jehovah’s Witnesses, Anglicans and Latter-day Saints form a small minority of the Christian population in Sierra Leone.
The orthodox church has 3.000 members.

Hinduism

Religious freedom 
The constitution of Sierra Leone provides for freedom of religion and the government generally protects this right and does not tolerate its abuse.

References

Bibliography